Valerio Nava (born 17 January 1994) is an Italian Isso's footballer who plays as a right back for Serie D club Albalonga.

Club career
Born in Calcinate, Nava began his career in local Atalanta, being assigned to the Primavera squad in 2011.

On 9 July 2013, after finishing his graduation, Nava was loaned to Serie B club Novara. He played his first match as a professional on 11 August,  starting in a 3–0 home success against Grosseto, for the campaign's Coppa Italia.

Nava made his Serie B debut late in the month, playing the full 90 minutes in a 2–1 home win against Siena Calcio.

In subsequent seasons, he alternates between the Serie B and Lega Pro playing respectively for Carpi, Spal, Ascoli, Cittadella, Catania and Alessandria.

On 9 January 2019, he signed a 1.5-year contract with Rimini.

On 9 January 2020, he signed a 1.5-year contract with Vis Pesaro.

On 31 August 2021, he moved to Serie C club Pergolettese.

References

External links

1994 births
Living people
People from Calcinate
Sportspeople from the Province of Bergamo
Footballers from Lombardy
Italian footballers
Association football defenders
Serie B players
Serie C players
Serie D players
Atalanta B.C. players
Novara F.C. players
A.C. Carpi players
S.P.A.L. players
Ascoli Calcio 1898 F.C. players
A.S. Cittadella players
Catania S.S.D. players
U.S. Alessandria Calcio 1912 players
S.S. Juve Stabia players
A.S. Pro Piacenza 1919 players
Rimini F.C. 1912 players
Vis Pesaro dal 1898 players
U.S. Pergolettese 1932 players
Italy youth international footballers